Luke Young may refer to:
Luke Young (footballer, born 1979), English footballer
Luke Young (footballer, born 1993), English footballer for Wrexham AFC
Luke Young (rugby league) (born 1980), Australian rugby league player
Luke Young (canoeist) (born 1978), Australian kayak Olympian